The Prince and the Showgirl (originally titled The Sleeping Prince) is a 1957 British romantic comedy film starring Marilyn Monroe and Laurence Olivier, who also served as director and producer. The screenplay written by Terence Rattigan was based on his 1953 stage play The Sleeping Prince. The Prince and the Showgirl was filmed at Pinewood Studios in Buckinghamshire.

Plot
In London in June 1911, George V will be crowned king on 22 June and in the preceding days, many important dignitaries arrive, including the 16-year-old King Nicholas VIII of the (fictional) Balkan country of Carpathia, with his father the stiff and pompous widower prince regent Charles, and his maternal grandmother the widowed queen dowager of Carpathia (inspired by King Michael I of Romania, King Carol II of Romania and Queen Marie of Romania).

As the British Government had decided that keeping Carpathia in the Triple Entente is critical amid the rising tensions in Europe, they wish to pamper the royals during their stay in London and assign civil servant Northbrook for the task. Northbrook takes Charles to the musical performance The Coconut Girl. During the intermission, Charles meets the cast backstage and is smitten with performer Elsie Marina, to whom he sends a formal invitation for midnight dinner at the Carpathian embassy.

Elsie meets Northbrook at the embassy before Charles arrives and expects a large party but soon realizes Charles' true intentions are to seduce her over a private supper, something a girl with her abundant feminine charms has been through too many times to fall for, and she attempts to leave. Northbrook persuades her to remain, promising to provide an excuse for her to escape after supper. When Charles makes a clumsy pass at her, she immediately rebuffs him and explains that she had hoped that he would sway her with romance, passion, and "gypsy violins." In response, Charles changes his style and tactics, complete with a violinist. The two eventually kiss and Elsie admits that she may be falling in love, turning aside Northbrook's pre-agreed attempt to help her leave the embassy. When Elsie passes out due to being encouraged to drink too much vodka Charles has four servants carry her on their shoulders like a log into an adjoining bedroom where she spends the night.

The following day, Elsie overhears that Nicholas is plotting with the German embassy to overthrow his father. Promising not to tell, Elsie then meets the dowager queen, Charles' mother-in-law, who invites Elsie to join them for the coronation in place of her sick lady-in-waiting. The ceremony passes and Elsie refuses to tell Charles of the treasonous plot. Nicholas invites Elsie to the coronation ball, where she persuades him to agree to a contract in which he will confess his and the Germans' intent, but only if Charles agrees to a general election. Charles is impressed and realizes that he has fallen in love with Elsie. The morning after the ball, Elsie helps reunite Charles and Nicholas. Her honesty and sincerity have inspired Charles to finally show sincere love to his son.

The next day, the Carpathians must return home. Charles had planned to have Elsie join them, but his regency will end in 18 months and he will then be a free citizen. Elsie reminds him that her music-hall contract will expire at the same time. They both realize that much can happen in 18 months and they say goodbye to each other.

Cast 

 Marilyn Monroe as Elsie Marina
 Laurence Olivier as Charles, the Prince Regent of Carpathia
 Sybil Thorndike as the Dowager Queen
 Richard Wattis as Northbrook
 Jeremy Spenser as King Nicolas
 Paul Hardwick as Major Domo
 Esmond Knight as Colonel Hoffman
 Rosamund Greenwood as Maud
 Aubrey Dexter as The Ambassador
 Maxine Audley as Lady Sunningdale
 Harold Goodwin as Call Boy
 Jean Kent as Maisie Springfield
 Daphne Anderson as Fanny
 Gillian Owen as Maggie
 Vera Day as Betty
 Margot Lister as Lottie
 Charles Victor as Theatre Manager
 David Horne as The Foreign Office
 Gladys Henson as Dresser

Production

The film was produced and directed by Laurence Olivier. It was shot in Technicolor at Pinewood Studios. Marilyn Monroe had formed her own company, Marilyn Monroe Productions, through which she purchased the rights to Terence Rattigan's The Sleeping Prince. Olivier and Vivien Leigh had played the lead roles in the original London production of the play.

Production was marred with difficulties between Monroe and her costars and the production team. According to Jean Kent, Monroe "appeared dirty and dishevelled" and "never arrived on time, never said a line the same way twice, seemed completely unable to hit her marks on the set and couldn’t and wouldn’t do anything at all without consulting her acting coach, Paula Strasberg." Kent claimed that she witnessed her costar Richard Wattis, who appeared in many scenes with Monroe, "take to drink because takes had to be done so many times" and that Monroe had an uneasy relationship with the normally quiet and placid cinematographer Jack Cardiff, who said that Olivier referred to her as a "bitch." Olivier also reportedly showed a strong dislike of Monroe and Strasberg, whom he evicted from the set at one point, causing Monroe to refuse to continue shooting until Strasberg returned. The relationship between Olivier and Monroe worsened when Olivier told her to "try and be sexy." According to Kent, Olivier's difficulties with Monroe caused him "to age 15 years."

Donald Sinden, a contract star for the Rank Organisation at Pinewood Studios, had a permanent dressing room four doors from Monroe's during filming, although he was working on a different film. Sinden said:

Monroe had an uncredited English body double for the movie, a young model whose stage name was Una Pearl. It was announced in Picturegoer magazine 18 August 1956.

Release
The film opened on 13 June 1957 in New York and in Los Angeles and London on 3 July 1957.

Reception

Box office
The Prince and the Showgirl was not a major box-office success, faring poorly in comparison to Monroe's earlier releases, such as The Seven Year Itch and Bus Stop. Particularly popular in the United Kingdom, it failed to find the same success in the U.S. but managed to earn a substantial profit.

Critical response
On Rotten Tomatoes, the film has an approval rating of 56% based on nine critics' reviews, with an average score of 5.7/10. Variety wrote in its original review: "This first indie production of Marilyn Monroe's company is a generally pleasant comedy, but the pace is leisurely. Filmed in London with a predominantly British cast, the film is not a cliche Cinderella story as its title might indicate." The New York Times stated that the film lacked originality and that Rattigan's characterizations were "too limiting" and "dull" to allow Monroe and Olivier to be showcased to their fullest potential.

Monroe and Olivier received particular praise for their performances. Thorndike's performance was also described as "excellent" by Variety.

Awards and nominations

Associated works
The 2011 film My Week with Marilyn depicts the week in which Monroe was escorted around London by personal assistant Colin Clark during the production of The Prince and the Showgirl. My Week with Marilyn is largely based upon two books written by Clark recounting his experiences during the production: My Week with Marilyn (2000) and The Prince, the Showgirl, and Me: Six Months on the Set With Marilyn and Olivier (1996). Both books and the film depict Monroe beginning a friendship and semi-romantic relationship with Clark for a brief time during production.

See also
 List of British films of 1957

References

External links

 
 
 
 
 

1957 films
1957 romantic comedy films
British films based on plays
British romantic comedy films
Films about couples
Films about princes
Films about royalty
Films directed by Laurence Olivier
Films scored by Richard Addinsell
Films set in the 1910s
Films set in 1911
Films set in London
Films shot at Pinewood Studios
Films shot in London
Films with screenplays by Terence Rattigan
Warner Bros. films
1950s English-language films
1950s British films